Gabrielle Serene Varner (born February 12, 1989) is an American singer-songwriter. Born into a musical family in Brooklyn, New York and raised in Los Angeles, Varner studied at New York University's Clive Davis Department of Recorded Music. In October 2009, she signed with RCA Records along with a co-publishing agreement with Sony Music.

Varner released her debut album, Perfectly Imperfect, in August 2012, preceded by the release of the single "Only Wanna Give It to You". The album debuted at number four on the US  Billboard Hot 200.

Early life
Varner is of Cape Verdean, African American, and Swedish descent, Elle herself has stated "my father is half Swedish and half black, and my mother is 100% Cape Verdean." The daughter of Mikelyn Roderick and Jimmy Varner, songwriters and publishers. Roderick was a backup vocalist for Barry White; and has written and recorded with Tevin Campbell and Rahsaan Patterson. Roderick released an album on the Dome label in 2007. Jimmy Varner is a songwriter, producer, and multi-instrumentalist who has collaborated with Gerald Alston, Kool & the Gang, and Will Downing. Her parents, together with Stan Sheppard, formed the group By All Means which was a minor success.

Varner spent most of her childhood sleeping on studio couches, running around green rooms, and watching her parents struggle to make a name in the industry. At age six she began to play musical instruments, beginning with the flute, and later she moved on to piano and guitar. She attended several music programs including actress Wendy Raquel Robinson's Amazing Grace Conservatory starting at age 11 and Alexander Hamilton High School's Academy of Music's Vocal Jazz Group. Varner then attended New York University’s Clive Davis Department of Recorded Music.

Career

2008-12: Perfectly Imperfect 
At age 16, Varner picked up a guitar for the first time. She dropped the guitar and became a part of Alexander Hamilton High School's Academy of Music's Vocal Jazz Group. Once there, she learned about the complexity of the voice, jazz music and talented jazz artists like Ella Fitzgerald. Varner was surprised to discover that she had been chosen to be a part of the Grammy in the Schools Mentoring Program. Through this program, she was taken weekly to the Fox Studio, where she met with mentor Kelly Burgos, and President of Fox Music, Robert Kraft. Soon after, Varner hesitantly applied to NYU with her C average and was surprisingly accepted. Not only did she get in, but also she was admitted into the second class of the Clive Davis Department of Recorded Music. Upon graduating, she was awarded "most likely to get signed" and "most likely to win a Grammy." Four years later she finds herself a well-rounded and cultured singer-songwriter. In 2008 Varner graduated from NYU's renowned Clive Davis Department of Recorded Music.
In October 2009 she signed with MBK/J-RCA Records along with a co-publishing agreement with Sony Music. After honing her skills even further, Varner became one of the first artists featured in BET's Music Matters campaign for 2010.

Varner's debut single "Only Wanna Give It to You" was released on August 6, 2011. The song, which serves as the lead single from her debut studio album Perfectly Imperfect (2012), features American rapper J. Cole. The song peaked at #20 on the US Billboard R&B/Hip-Hop Songs chart. In October 2011, she was listed as one of TheBoomBox's '15 Artists to Watch' and was one of the artists featured in BET's Music Matters campaign.  On October 7, 2011, RCA Music Group announced it was disbanding J Records along with Arista Records and Jive Records.  With the shutdown, Varner (and all other artists previously signed to these three labels) will release her future material on RCA Records.
In preparation for her debut studio album, Varner released a mixtape on January 23, 2012, titled Conversational Lush as promotion towards her debut. The second single from Varner's debut album "Refill" was released to iTunes January 31, 2012, and debuted at #78 on the US Billboard R&B/Hip-Hop Songs chart. On February 11, 2012, Varner and The Roots gave a performance dedicated to Whitney Houston, for the Roots Pre-Grammy Jam Session at the House of Blues in Los Angeles. When asked in an interview what is to be expected from her debut, Varner said in a statement: “a lot of color, a lot of range. There’s fun songs, emotional songs, deep songs, everything you could think about is on that album."

Elle Varner's debut album, Perfectly Imperfect, was released on August 7, 2012 debuting at number four on the U.S. Billboard 200 chart, with first-week sales of 33,000 copies in the United States. It also debuted at number two on the Billboard Top R&B/Hip-Hop Albums. As of October 20, 2012, Perfectly Imperfect has charted for ten weeks on the Billboard 200. In September 2012, Varner was credited for co-writing the song "Use Me", for fellow American R&B singer Miguel, taken from his second album Kaleidoscope Dream.

2013-2016: Four Letter Word
For her second studio album, Varner has been working with producers including Pop & Oak, Eric Hudson, DJ Dahi, Da Internz, and Hit-Boy. Varner stated that she has made her own genre while recording the album which she titles "trap jazz." Varner described her second album as “definitely sexier,” than her previous, she later released the promotional single "Rover" featuring American rapper Wale. After many pushbacks, Four Letter Word was eventually shelved and Elle was subsequently dropped from RCA Records.

2019-Present: Ellevation 
In 2019 Varner released her debut  EP Ellevation which marked Varner’s first work since Perfectly Imperfect in 2012. The 2019 version of the artist shows nuanced inspirations derived from alternative RnB, indie, and soul, with sprinklings of homages to Jill Scott and Erykah Badu.

Artistry

Varner's voice has been compared to that of British singer Adele containing "soul "with a touch of raspy seduction." She is a mezzo-soprano Varner's debut mixtape contained an "eclectic mix of pop, hip hop, and soul", that contained lyrical content regarding "relationship issues, girl power and fun" as well as being compared to Rihanna and Erykah Badu.

Varner cites rapper Kanye West and soul singer Adele as two major influences noting that she wanted to combine both soul and hip-hop together saying "I only really wanted to combine the best of Hip-Hop and the best of that singer/songwriter soul. So I just picked those two as an example". Elle also draws inspiration from her hometown of Los Angeles commenting on how Los Angeles influences her she said “For me, there’s a nostalgia about L.A., especially West Coast rap, like N.W.A will always be a part of me growing up.” Varner also cites Mariah Carey, Brandy and Monica as influences.

Varner counts Ella Fitzgerald as great influence on her musical style. Commenting on Fitzgerald, Varner said "I just would always listen to her voice and say “Oh my God, how does she do it?” You know it's like she has this enchanting, beautiful voice and I'm very enthused by her."

Discography

Studio albums
 Perfectly Imperfect (2012)
Ellevation (2019)

Mixtapes
 Conversational Lush (2012)

Tours

Headlining
 The Ellevation Tour (2020)

Supporting
 Chapter V World Tour (2012)
 NYLA Tour  (2019)

Awards and nominations

Grammy Awards

|-
| 2013
| "Refill"
| Best R&B Song
|

BET Awards

|-
| 2013
| Elle Varner
| Best R&B Female Artist
|

References

External links
 
 Official fansite Official fansite
 Elle Varner at AllMusic
 Elle Varner Elle Varner 
 Elle Varner Discography 

1989 births
Living people
American musicians of Cape Verdean descent
African-American women singer-songwriters
Musicians from Los Angeles
American rhythm and blues singer-songwriters
RCA Records artists
J Records artists
American women hip hop singers
Singer-songwriters from California
American soul singers
Tisch School of the Arts alumni
American contemporary R&B singers
21st-century African-American women singers